George Geza Szpiro (born 18 February 1950 in Vienna) is an Israeli–Swiss author, journalist, and mathematician. He has written articles and books on popular mathematics and related topics.

Life and career
Szpiro was born in Vienna in 1950, and moved to Zug, Switzerland, in 1961. He obtained a master's degree in mathematics and physics from ETH Zurich.  He also obtained an MBA from Stanford University, in 1975. Afterward, he worked as a management consultant at McKinsey & Company. In 1984, he obtained a Ph.D. in mathematical economics from Hebrew University.

Szpiro was an assistant professor at the Wharton School of the University of Pennsylvania, during 1984–1986. He was a lecturer in mathematical economics at Hebrew University, during 1986–1992. He also taught at the University of Zurich. He has published research papers related to mathematics, finance, and statistics.

Since 1986, Szpiro has worked as a journalist at Neue Zürcher Zeitung. At NZZ, he has been the Israel correspondent and mathematics columnist. For his mathematics columns, Szpiro was awarded the Prix Média by the Swiss Academy of Natural Sciences, in 2003. He was also awarded the Media Prize by the German Mathematical Society, in 2006. Beside writing for NZZ, he has also written non-research mathematics columns for journals such as Nature and Notices of the American Mathematical Society.

Szpiro married in 1979. He and his wife, Fortuna, have three children.

Books
  Kepler's Conjecture: How Some of the Greatest Minds in History Helped Solve One of the Oldest Math Problems in the World (John Wiley & Sons, 2003)
 The Secret Life of Numbers: 50 Easy Pieces on How Mathematicians Work and Think (Joseph Henry Press, 2006) 
 Poincaré's Prize: The Hundred-Year Quest to Solve One of Math's Greatest Puzzles (Dutton, 2007) 
 Numbers Rule: The Vexing Mathematics of Democracy, from Plato to the Present (Princeton University Press, 2010) 
 A Mathematical Medley: Fifty Easy Pieces on Mathematics (American Mathematical Society, 2010) 
 Pricing the Future: Finance, Physics, and the 300-year Journey to the Black-Scholes Equation (Basic Books, 2011)

Notes

External links
 
    —website of George Szpiro
 
 "The Truth, the Whole Truth, And Nothing but the Truth"   —YouTube video of Szpiro discussing the difficulties a journalist faces when writing about mathematics for a general audience (the discussion was part of a  seminar at the University of Edinburgh: dated 9 April 2015)

1950 births
ETH Zurich alumni
Hebrew University of Jerusalem alumni
Living people
Mathematics popularizers
Austrian non-fiction writers
Israeli non-fiction writers
Swiss non-fiction writers
Science journalists
Stanford Graduate School of Business alumni